Zalesye is a rural locality (a village) in Arkhangelskoye Rural Settlement, Sokolsky District, Vologda Oblast, Russia. The population was 5 as of 2002.

Geography 
Zalesye is located 16 km northwest of Sokol (the district's administrative centre) by road. Kozhukhovo is the nearest rural locality.

References 

Rural localities in Sokolsky District, Vologda Oblast